Apicalia tryoni is a species of sea snail, a marine gastropod mollusk in the family Eulimidae.

Distribution
This marine species is endemic to Australia and occurs off Tasmania, Victoria and Western Australia.

References

 Tate, R. & May, W.L. 1900. Descriptions of new genera and species of Australian Mollusca (chiefly Tasmanian). Transactions of the Royal Society of South Australia 24(2): 90-103
 Cotton, B.C. 1959. South Australian Mollusca. Archaeogastropoda. Handbook of the Flora and Fauna of South Australia. Adelaide : South Australian Government Printer 449 pp.

External links
 To World Register of Marine Species

Eulimidae
Gastropods of Australia
Gastropods described in 1900